Road Trips Volume 3 Number 2 is two-CD live album by the American rock band the Grateful Dead.  The tenth in their "Road Trips" series of albums, it was released on February 24, 2010.  It contains the complete concert recorded on November 15, 1971, at Austin Memorial Auditorium in Austin, Texas.  This concert was the 16th concert after Keith Godchaux joined the Grateful Dead on piano.  Ron "Pigpen" McKernan did not perform at this or any of the October and November, 1971 concerts due to poor health.

A third, "bonus" disc was included with early shipments of the album.  The bonus disc contains material from the concert held the previous evening, November 14, 1971, at Texas Christian University in Fort Worth, Texas.

Other live Grateful Dead albums recorded during this same concert tour are Dick's Picks Volume 2, Grateful Dead Download Series Volume 3, and Dave's Picks Volume 26.

Track listing

Disc One
First set:
"Truckin'" (Jerry Garcia, Phil Lesh, Bob Weir, Robert Hunter) – 9:21
"Bertha" (Garcia, Hunter) – 6:03
"Playing in the Band" (Weir, Hunter) – 6:34
"Deal" (Garcia, Hunter) – 5:13
"Jack Straw" (Weir, Hunter) – 5:32
"Loser" (Garcia, Hunter) – 6:41
"Beat It on Down the Line" (Jesse Fuller) – 3:41
"Dark Star" > (Garcia, Hunter) – 12:49
"El Paso" > (Marty Robbins) – 4:55
"Dark Star" > (Garcia, Hunter) – 7:45
"Casey Jones" (Hunter, Garcia) – 5:52
"One More Saturday Night" (Weir) – 5:01

Disc Two
Second set:

Encore:

Bonus Disc
Texas Christian University, Fort Worth, Texas, November 14, 1971:
"China Cat Sunflower" > (Garcia, Hunter) – 5:07
"I Know You Rider" (traditional, arranged by Grateful Dead) – 6:34
"Sugaree" (Garcia, Hunter) – 7:10
"Truckin'" > (Garcia, Lesh, Weir, Hunter) – 10:35
"Drums" > (Bill Kreutzmann) – 4:24
"The Other One" > (Weir, Kreutzmann) – 8:50
"Me and My Uncle" > (Phillips) – 3:17
"The Other One" > (Weir, Kreutzmann) – 12:15
"Wharf Rat" > (Garcia, Hunter) – 9:44
"Sugar Magnolia" (Weir, Hunter) – 6:47

Personnel

Grateful Dead

 Jerry Garcia – lead guitar, vocals
 Keith Godchaux – piano
 Bill Kreutzmann – drums
 Phil Lesh – electric bass, vocals
 Bob Weir – rhythm guitar, vocals

Production

Produced by Grateful Dead
Produced for release by David Lemieux & Blair Jackson
Recording by Rex Jackson
CD Mastering by Jeffrey Norman at Mockingbird Mastering, Petaluma, CA
Cover Art by Scott McDougall
Back Cover Photo by Bob Seidemann
Interior Photos by Mary Ann Mayer
Package Design by Steve Vance

Sound quality

The album was released in HDCD format.  This provides enhanced sound quality when played on CD players with HDCD capability, and is fully compatible with regular CD players.

November 14, 1971 set list
The set list for the November 14, 1971 concert at Texas Christian University in Fort Worth, Texas was:

First set: "Bertha", "Beat It On Down The Line", "China Cat Sunflower"*, "I Know You Rider"*, "El Paso", "Sugaree"*, "Jack Straw", "Big Railroad Blues", "Me & Bobby McGee", "Loser", "Playing in the Band", "Tennessee Jed", "You Win Again", "Mexicali Blues", "Casey Jones", "One More Saturday Night"
Second set:' "Truckin'"*, "Drums"*, "The Other One"*, "Me & My Uncle"*, "The Other One"*, "Wharf Rat"*, "Sugar Magnolia"*
Encore: "Johnny B. Goode"

*Included in the Road Trips Volume 3 Number 2 bonus disc

References

Road Trips albums
2010 live albums